The Bahamas competed at the 2015 Pan American Games in Toronto, Ontario, Canada from July 10 to 26, 2015.

On July 2, 2015, the Bahamas Olympic Committee named a provisional squad of 36 athletes in five sports (which was later increased to 38, after the approval of three additional track and field athletes). This marked an increase of 17 athletes from the last edition of the games in 2011. This also marked the country's debut in the sport of gymnastics at the Pan American Games. Swimmer Arianna Vanderpool-Wallace was the flagbearer for the team during the opening ceremony.

Bahamas finished the Games with a total of six medals (two of each kind), doubling the total the country won four years prior in Guadalajara.

Competitors
The following table lists Bahamas' delegation per sport and gender.

Medalists

The following competitors from The Bahamas won medals at the games. In the by discipline sections below, medalists' names are bolded.

|  style="text-align:left; width:78%; vertical-align:top;"|

|  style="text-align:left; width:22%; vertical-align:top;"|

Athletics

The Bahamas qualified 29 athletes in track and field (16 men and 13 women).

Men

Field events

Women

Field events

Boxing

The Bahamas qualified three male boxers.

Men

Gymnastics

The Bahamas qualified one gymnast. This marked the country's debut in gymnastics at the Pan American Games.

Artistic
Women

Swimming

The Bahamas qualified four female swimmers, and one male swimmer, for a total of five.

Men

Women

Tennis

The Bahamas qualified one athlete in the men's singles event.

Men

See also
Bahamas at the 2016 Summer Olympics

References

Nations at the 2015 Pan American Games
2015
Pan American Games